Stig Tomas Norström (23 May 1956 – 3 October 2021) was a Swedish actor and film director. He also recorded audiobooks, among them J. R. R. Tolkien's works.

Norström studied at the Swedish National Academy of Mime and Acting until 1981, together with Jessica Zandén, Maria Johansson, Sissela Kyle, and Peter Stormare.

Partial filmography

1976: Near and Far Away - Gregor
1977: Mackan - Roffe
1979: En kärleks sommar - Laboratorieassistenten
1979: Kejsaren - Dräng
1980: Der Mann, der sich in Luft auflöste - Kvant
1981: Höjdhoppar'n - Rickard
1981: Varning för Jönssonligan - Kriminalassistent Holm
1983: Second Dance - Manne
1984: Två solkiga blondiner - Holken
1984: Sköna juveler - Robber
1985: Svindlande affärer - Tecknar-Micke
1987: Res aldrig på enkel biljett
1988: Som man ropar (TV Mini Series) - Gerard
1988: Venus 90 - Kenneth, Sound engineer
1990: Werther - Max Karlsson
1990: S*M*A*S*H (TV Mini Series) - Börje
1990: I skog och mark
1990: The Rabbit Man - Henrik
1990: Good Evening, Mr. Wallenberg - Andersson
1991: The White Viking - Bishop Thangbrandur
1992: Hammar - Bror Hammar
1992: Min store tjocke far - Vicar
1993: Dreaming of Rita - Verkstadsägare
1993: Kådisbellan - Boxing Trainer
1994: Polismördaren - Herrgott Nöjd
1994: Stockholm Marathon - Ypsilon (voice, uncredited)
1994: Händerna - Kjell-Åke
1994: Bert (TV Series) - Banan-Boris Strängborn
1995: Vita lögner - Delgivningsman
1996: Jägarna - Ove
1996: Drömprinsen - Filmen om Em - Larsa
1996: Lögn - The Associate Professor's Mother's Lover
1997: Reine & Mimmi i fjällen! - Folke Nilsson
1998-2000: Pistvakt – En vintersaga (TV Series) - Olle Ivar Marklund / Pelle
2000: Hur som helst är han jävligt död - Editor Flink
2002: Livet i 8 bitar - Stig
2003: Kitchen Stories - Folke Nilsson
2005: Spadek - Krister
2005: Pistvakt - Olle Ivar Marklund
2005: Wallander (TV Series) - Kuratorn
2006: Inga tårar - Arvid
2006: LasseMajas detektivbyrå (TV Series) - Polismästaren
2007: Beck (TV Series) - Jon Ljunggren
2007: Blåbärskriget - Bärkungen
2008: LasseMajas detektivbyrå – Kameleontens hämnd - Polismästaren
2010: Home for Christmas - Kristen
2013: LasseMajas detektivbyrå - Von Broms hemlighet - Polismästaren
2014: LasseMajas detektivbyrå - Skuggor över Valleby - Polismästaren
2015: Villmark 2 - Frank
2015: LasseMajas detektivbyrå - Stella Nostra - Polismästaren
2016: A Cure for Wellness - Frank Hill
2018: LasseMajas detektivbyrå - Det första mysteriet - Police Chief / Gym Teacher
2020: Lasse-Majas detektivbyrå – Tågrånarens hemlighet - Polismästaren

He also directed the 2008 film Gunnel together with Henrik Carlheim-Gyllenskiöld.

References

External links
 Swedish Film Database
 
 

1956 births
2021 deaths
Swedish film directors
Swedish male film actors
People from Södertälje
20th-century Swedish male actors
21st-century Swedish male actors